John Henry Sununu (born July 2, 1939) is an American politician who was the 75th governor of New Hampshire from 1983 to 1989 and later White House Chief of Staff under President George H. W. Bush. Born in Cuba to an American father and a Salvadoran mother, he is of Greek, Hispanic, Palestinian, and Lebanese descent, making him the first Arab American, Greek American and Hispanic American to be governor of New Hampshire and White House Chief of Staff. He is the father of John E. Sununu, the former United States Senator from New Hampshire, and Christopher Sununu, the current governor of New Hampshire. Sununu was the chairman of the New Hampshire Republican Party from 2009 to 2011.

Early life and education
Sununu was born in Havana, Cuba while his parents were visiting Cuba on a business trip. He is the son of John Saleh Sununu, an international film distributor, and Victoria Sununu (née Dada). His father's family came to the United States from Lebanon, as Greek Orthodox practitioners at the turn of the 20th century and his ancestry was Greek and Lebanese from Jerusalem and Beirut respectively. John Saleh Sununu was born in Boston, Massachusetts. His mother Victoria Dada was born in El Salvador. Her family were also Greek Orthodox practitioners, of Greek and Hispanic ancestry, and had settled in Central America at the turn of the 20th century. Sununu visited Beirut, Lebanon as a child in the late 1940s. He grew up in New York City and graduated from the La Salle Military Academy on Long Island.

Sununu earned a Bachelor of Science degree in 1961, a Master of Science degree in 1963, and a PhD in 1966 from the Massachusetts Institute of Technology, all in mechanical engineering. He is a member of the Phi Sigma Kappa fraternity.

Career
From 1966 to 1982 he taught at Tufts University, where he was an associate professor of mechanical engineering. He was the associate dean of the University's College of Engineering from 1968 to 1973. As of 1988, Sununu retained his title and family tuition benefits from Tufts during an "extremely rare" unpaid six-year leave of absence that coincided with his governorship. He was on the Advisory Board of the Technology and Policy Program at MIT from 1984 until 1989.

A Republican, Sununu held a seat in the New Hampshire House of Representatives from 1973 to 1975 for the 5th Rockingham district. Sununu ran for the New Hampshire Senate in 1974 and 1976, but lost the general election both times to Delbert F. Downing. He ran for the Executive Council of New Hampshire in 1978, but lost the general election to Dudley Dudley. He ran for the United States Senate in 1980, but lost the Republican primary to Warren Rudman.

Governor
Sununu became New Hampshire's 75th Governor on January 6, 1983, and was re-elected twice to hold the position for three consecutive terms. He was the first Arab-American Governor of New Hampshire. Sununu was chairman of the Coalition of Northeastern Governors, the Republican Governors Association and, in 1987, the National Governors Association.

Sununu angered some when he was the only governor of a U.S. state not to call for repeal of the UN General Assembly Resolution 3379 ("Zionism is racism").  He later reversed his position on this issue and supported the Republicans' pro-Israel 1988 platform.

White House Chief of Staff
Sununu was the first White House Chief of Staff for George H. W. Bush, holding the position from 1989 to 1991. Time magazine dubbed him "Bush's Bad Cop" on the front cover on May 21, 1990.

Sununu is considered to have engineered Bush's mid-term abandonment of his 1988 campaign promise of "no new taxes". In his report Losing Earth: The Decade We Almost Stopped Climate Change, Nathaniel Rich wrote that in November 1989 Sununu prevented the signing of a 67-nation commitment at the Noordwijk Climate Conference to freeze carbon dioxide emissions, with a reduction of 20 percent by 2005, and singled him out as a force starting coordinated efforts to bewilder the public on the topic of global warming and changing it from an urgent, nonpartisan and unimpeachable issue to a political one. Interviewed as to his involvement in preventing an agreement, he stated: "It couldn’t have happened, because, frankly, the leaders in the world at that time were at a stage where they were all looking how to seem like they were supporting the policy without having to make hard commitments that would cost their nations serious resources. Frankly, that’s about where we are today."

Sununu is responsible for recommending David Souter of New Hampshire to President George H. W. Bush for appointment to the Supreme Court of the United States, at the behest of his close friend, then-U.S. Senator and fellow New Hampshirite Warren Rudman. The Wall Street Journal described the events leading up to the appointment of the "liberal jurist" in a 2000 editorial, saying Rudman in his "Yankee Republican liberalism" took "pride in recounting how he sold Mr. Souter to gullible White House chief of staff John Sununu as a confirmable conservative. Then they both sold the judge to President Bush, who wanted above all else to avoid a confirmation battle [after Robert Bork]." Rudman wrote in his memoir that he had "suspected all along" that Souter would not "overturn activist liberal precedents." Sununu later said that he had "a lot of disappointment" about Souter's positions on the Court and would have preferred him to be more similar to Justice Antonin Scalia.

At the recommendation of George W. Bush, Sununu resigned his White House post on December 4, 1991. He remained at the White House as Counselor to the President until March 1, 1992.

Expenses controversy
As White House Chief of Staff,  Sununu reportedly took personal trips, for skiing and other purposes, and classified them as official, for purposes such as conservation or promoting the Thousand Points of Light.  The Washington Post wrote that Sununu's jets "took him to fat-cat Republican fund-raisers, ski lodges, golf resorts and even his dentist in Boston." Sununu had paid the government only $892 for his more than $615,000 worth of military jet travel.  Sununu said that his use of the jets was necessary because he had to be near a telephone at all times for reasons of national security. Sununu became the subject of much late-night television humor over the incident. Sununu worsened the situation shortly afterwards when, after leaking rumors of financial difficulties in his family, he traveled to a rare stamp auction at Christie's auction house in New York City from Washington in a government limousine, spending $5,000 on rare stamps.  Sununu then sent the car and driver back to Washington unoccupied while he returned on a corporate jet.  In the course of one week, 45 newspapers ran editorials on Sununu, nearly all of them critical of his actions.  Sununu resigned his White House post on December 4, 1991. Sununu repaid over $47,000 to the government for the flights on the orders of White House counsel C. Boyden Gray, with the help of the Republican Party. However, the reimbursements were at commercial rates, which are about one-tenth the cost of the actual flights; one ski trip to Vail, Colorado alone had cost taxpayers $86,330.

Other activities
Sununu co-hosted CNN's nightly Crossfire from March 1992 until February 1998.

From 1963 until 1983, he was President of JHS Engineering Company and Thermal Research Inc. In addition, he helped establish and worked as chief engineer for Astro Dynamics Inc. from 1960 until 1965.

In 2012, Sununu as a national co-chair for the Mitt Romney presidential campaign made controversial comments directed towards then President Barack Obama calling Obama "un-American." After receiving backlash for the comment, Sununu apologized soon afterwards. A few months later, Sununu again caused controversy for the Romney campaign when he said that the reason he believed former Secretary of State, Colin Powell (a Republican) endorsed President Obama over Romney was because both Powell and Obama are the same race. After the election, Sununu blamed Romney's loss to Obama on Obama's supporters being "dependent" on government programs.

Sununu is President of JHS Associates, Ltd. and is a partner in Trinity International Partners, a private financial firm. He is also a member of Honorary Council of Advisors for U.S.-Azerbaijan Chamber of Commerce (USACC).

Awards and honors
He was elected a member of the National Academy of Engineering in 1990 for exceptionally significant creativity in energy systems development, in engineering education, and in integration of technological advances with public policy.

Personal life

Sununu is married to the former Nancy Hayes, and they have eight children, including former U.S. Senator John E. Sununu and Chris Sununu, formerly a member of the New Hampshire Executive Council and currently the Governor of New Hampshire. In recent years, he moved from Salem, New Hampshire to Hampton Falls, New Hampshire to be closer to relatives. He and his wife were subsequently elected as the town's honorary hog reeves and poundkeepers. The title is usually given to an unsuspecting newcomer each year.

Sununu's daughter Cathy is the president of the Portsmouth Museum of Art in Portsmouth, New Hampshire.

Sununu is a fluent Spanish speaker.

In popular culture
In the 1991 police comedy film The Naked Gun 2½: The Smell of Fear, Sununu is played by Peter Van Norden.

In January 1995, John Sununu made a cameo appearance on the first episode of the Delta Burke CBS sitcom, Women of the House, titled "Miss Sugarbaker Goes to Washington". In the episode, Suzanne Sugarbaker is a guest on the CNN political program, Crossfire. Michael Kinsley also appears.

In the 1996 film Mystery Science Theater 3000: The Movie, a clip (from This Island Earth) of a jet plane prompts Tom Servo to quip, "John Sununu goes for a haircut." The joke was a recurring one on the original series, as well.

Political endorsements
After the first presidential debate, on September 26, 2016, Sununu endorsed Donald Trump for President of the United States.

See also
 List of minority governors and lieutenant governors in the United States
 List of U.S. state governors born outside the United States

References

External links

 Profile at the Heartland Institute
 Profile at SourceWatch
 

|-

|-

|-

|-

|-

|-

|-

1939 births
American people of Arab descent
American people of Greek descent
American politicians of Lebanese descent
American politicians of Palestinian descent
American politicians of Salvadoran descent
Chairpersons of the New Hampshire Republican State Committee
Republican Party governors of New Hampshire
Hispanic and Latino American state governors of the United States
Living people
Republican Party members of the New Hampshire House of Representatives
Members of the United States National Academy of Engineering
MIT School of Engineering alumni
People from Havana
Sununu family
Tufts University faculty
White House Chiefs of Staff